Hillared is a locality situated in Svenljunga Municipality, Västra Götaland County, Sweden with 578 inhabitants in 2010.

References 

Populated places in Västra Götaland County
Populated places in Svenljunga Municipality